The Catholic Church in Costa Rica is part of the worldwide Catholic Church, under the spiritual leadership of the Pope in Rome. There are approximately 2.3 million Catholics in Costa Rica - 47% of the total population.  The country is divided into eight dioceses and one archdiocese:

Archdiocese of San José de Costa Rica
Diocese of Alajuela
Diocese of Cartago
Diocese of Ciudad Quesada
Diocese of Limón
Diocese of Puntarenas
Diocese of San Isidro de El General
Diocese of Tilarán

See also
Religion in Costa Rica
List of Central American and Caribbean saints

References

External links
Catholic Church Archdiocese of San José de Costa Rica

 
Costa Rica